Imperial is an administrative neighborhood (barrio) of Madrid belonging to the district of Arganzuela. It is 0.967500 km² in size.

References 

Wards of Madrid
Arganzuela